The al-Bad Museum for Olive Oil Production, also known as Badd Jackaman Museum (also known as the al-Bad Museum for Olive Oil Production) is located in the center of Bethlehem, Palestine, near the Church of the Nativity. The museum houses several ethnographic and archaeological artifacts depicting the process of olive oil production. The exhibits demonstrate the use of olive oil for lamps, medicine, food, soap, cosmetics, etc.

The building in which the museum was built dates from the late 18th century. From 1998 to 2000, the museum was restored by the Department of Antiquities of the State of Palestine, in coordination with the UNDP and the Greek Orthodox Society.

In April 2002, during the invasion and siege of the Church of the Nativity, Israeli forces stormed the museum. On May 25, 2006, Israeli forces destroyed the museum's main gate and broke into the museum; as a result, a number of antique pottery jars and flasks, and some office supplies, were destroyed.

See also 
 List of museums in Palestine

References 

Buildings and structures in Bethlehem
Museums in the West Bank
Environment of Palestine (region)
1999 establishments in the Palestinian territories